Leshgun (also Romanized as Leshgūn; also known as Lashkoon, Leshkān, Leshkūn, and Līshkūn) is a village in Howmeh Rural District, in the Central District of Lamerd County, Fars Province, Iran. At the 2006 census, its population was 378, in 80 families.

References 

Populated places in Lamerd County